Fanshawe Dam is a dam located on North Thames River near the eastern edge of London, Ontario. The crest of the dam is 625 metres long. It is 30.5 metres in height and drops the river surface 12 metres. Fanshawe Lake is the reservoir created by the dam.
The hydroelectric generator of the Fanshawe Dam generates enough power to run 400 households.
It is one of three dams on the Thames River and its tributaries.

After repeated floods, the Upper Thames River Conservation Authority built the dam to control the level of the Thames River; construction began in 1950 and completed in 1952.
It cost $5 million - Federal government 37.5%, Provincial government 37.5%, Upper Thames River Conservation Authority 25% (95% from City of London, Ontario, 5% from London Township).
A seismograph is placed inside the dam by the University of Western Ontario’s geology department.

See also
List of reservoirs and dams in Canada 
 Pittock Dam (Thames River)
 Wildwood Dam (Thames River)

References

Dams in Ontario
Buildings and structures in London, Ontario
Dams completed in 1952